The Peninsular Car Company was a railroad rolling stock manufacturer, founded by Charles L. Freer and Frank J. Hecker in 1885.

In 1892, the company merged with Michigan Car Company, the Russel Wheel and Foundry Company, the Detroit Car Wheel Company and several smaller manufacturers to form the Michigan-Peninsular Car Company.

Sources

 Willis F. Dunbar and George S. May.  Michigan: A History of the Wolverine State.  3rd Revised Ed., (Grand Rapids: William B. Eerdmans, 1995), 413–4.

Defunct rolling stock manufacturers of the United States
Manufacturing companies based in Detroit
1885 establishments in Michigan